The Gould Hyde Norton House is a historic home in Eustis, Florida, United States. It is located at 1390 East Lakeview Drive. On May 16, 1997, it was added to the U.S. National Register of Historic Places.

References

External links 
 Lake County listings at National Register of Historic Places
 Letter in the April 20, 1882 Winfield Courier
 History of Cowley County, Kansas - James and Samuel Topliff

Houses on the National Register of Historic Places in Florida
National Register of Historic Places in Lake County, Florida
Houses in Lake County, Florida
Eustis, Florida
Italianate architecture in Florida